The Roman Agora at Athens is located to the north of the Acropolis and to the east of the Ancient Agora.

History
The Roman Agora was built around 100 metres east of the original agora by Eucles of Marathon between 27 BC and 17 BC (or possibly in 10 BC), using funds donated by Augustus, in fulfilment of a promise originally made by Julius Caesar in 51 BC. The Roman Agora has not today been fully excavated, but is known to have been a open space surrounded by a peristyle. To its south was a fountain. To its west, behind a marble colonnade, were shops and an Ionic propylaeum (entrance), the Gate of Athena Archegetis. To its east was a Doric gate, the East Propylon, next to the Tower of the Winds and a set of "vespasianae" (public toilets). An inscription records the existence of an Agoranomion (an office for market officials). The Fethiye Mosque was built to the north during the Ottoman period.

See also
 Hadrian's Library

Footnotes

Bibliography

External links

 The Roman Agora & the Tower of Winds at The Stoa Consortium (www.stoa.org).
 The Roman Agora: the first commercial centre of Athens at National Hellenistic Research Foundation (www.eie.gr).

Roman Athens
Roman sites in Greece
Ancient Roman buildings and structures in Greece